Lu Su (172–217), courtesy name Zijing, was a Chinese military general and politician serving under the warlord Sun Quan during the late Eastern Han dynasty. In the year 200, when Sun Quan had just taken over the reins of power, his adviser Zhou Yu recommended Lu Su as a talent to Sun Quan. As one of Sun Quan's most important advisers in the warlord's early career, Lu Su is best known for making some significant contributions. Firstly, in 200 he drafted a long-term strategy for Sun Quan's power bloc to emerge as one of three major contending powers in China – a plan similar to Zhuge Liang's Longzhong Plan, which was proposed about seven years later. Secondly, before the Battle of Red Cliffs in late 208, he was the first person to persuade Sun Quan to ally with Liu Bei against Cao Cao. Thirdly, he succeeded Zhou Yu as the frontline commander of Sun Quan's forces in 210 after Zhou's death and maintained the Sun–Liu alliance. Fourthly, in 215, he represented Sun Quan at the negotiations with Liu Bei's general Guan Yu during the Sun–Liu territorial dispute over Jing Province.

Early life
Lu Su was from Dongcheng County, Linhuai Commandery, which is located southeast of present-day Dingyuan County, Anhui. He lost his father not long after he was born, so he lived with his grandmother. Lu Su was very generous with his family's wealth as he used it to help the needy. Wei Zhao's Book of Wu described Lu Su as having a stalwart and extraordinary appearance. He had great ambitions since he was young and was very fond of strategy.

Towards the end of the Eastern Han dynasty, when chaos broke out throughout China due to the Yellow Turban Rebellion and Dong Zhuo's tyranny, Lu Su sold his family's lands and properties and used the money to help the poor. He also spent his time associating with other reputable and talented persons. He was well-loved by his fellow townsfolk.

The Book of Wu gave another account of Lu Su's life during that chaotic period. Apart from practising sword-fighting, horse-riding and archery, he also hired a group of young men as his retainers, and provided them with clothing and food. They often went to the hills to hunt and practise military arts. The elders of the clan remarked: "We got this wild boy because the Lu clan is in decline!"

Moving to Jiangdong
Around 196, when Zhou Yu was nominally serving as the Chief of Juchao County under the warlord Yuan Shu, he wanted to leave Yuan Shu and travel east to the Jiangdong (or Wu) region to join Sun Ce, who had recently conquered some territories in Jiangdong over the past few years. Along the way, Zhou Yu and his militia, numbering a few hundred men, visited Lu Su and requested for supplies. At the time, Lu Su owned two large granaries, each capable of storing 3,000 hu of grain. He pointed at one granary and gave it to Zhou Yu. Realising that Lu Su was no ordinary person, Zhou Yu thanked and befriended him. The third-century historian Chen Shou compared their friendship to that of Gongsun Qiao and Ji Zha during the Spring and Autumn period. The Chinese idiom "pointing at a granary and presenting it", which means to generously provide aid to someone, originated from this anecdote.

When Yuan Shu heard of Lu Su's fame, he wanted to recruit him to serve as the Chief of Dongcheng County (東城縣; present-day Suining County, Jiangsu). However, Lu Su refused because he saw that Yuan Shu's administration was ill-disciplined and predicted that Yuan Shu would ultimately meet his downfall. He told his followers, "The central government has collapsed. Robbers and bandits are rampant. The areas around the Huai and Si rivers are no longer safe. I heard the lands in Jiangdong are fertile and they have a prosperous population and powerful armed forces. We can take shelter there. Are you willing to accompany me to that paradise and wait until stability is restored in central China?" They unanimously agreed to follow him.

Lu Su led his followers and some civilians southward to Juchao County to join Zhou Yu. He ordered able-bodied young men to guard the rear while the others continued moving forward. The local authorities sent some armed horsemen to stop Lu Su and his followers from leaving. When the riders caught up with them, Lu Su turned back and said, "All of you are capable men, so you should understand what's going on. The Empire is now in a state of chaos. While you won't be rewarded for your efforts (even if you manage to stop us), you will also not be punished for failing to stop us. Do you really want to force us to fight?" He then placed a shield upright on the ground and fired an arrow at it. The arrow pierced through the shield. The horsemen realised that they could not stop Lu Su so they gave up and left. Lu Su and his followers then crossed the Yangtze River with Zhou Yu and arrived in Jiangdong, where they met Sun Ce, who also saw great potential in Lu Su.

In Jiangdong, Lu Su lived in Qu'e County (曲阿縣; in present-day Danyang, Jiangsu) for some time before making a short trip back to Dongcheng County later to attend his grandmother's funeral.

Nearly leaving Jiangdong
Liu Ye, a friend of Lu Su, once wrote a letter to him: "Warlords and heroes have emerged all over the Empire. I believe the time has come for me to put my talents to good use. I am in a rush to fetch my mother but I will be stopping at Dongcheng County for a while. I heard that recently there is one Zheng Bao (鄭寶) who has rallied thousands of followers in Chaohu and gained control over some very fertile lands. Many people in Lujiang Commandery are planning to join him – including myself. As of now, he is still gathering followers. You should act fast and not miss this opportunity." Lu Su agreed with what Liu Ye told him. After his grandmother's funeral, Lu Su returned to Qu'e County and planned to leave Jiangdong and head north to join Zheng Bao. However, after he found out that Zhou Yu had fetched his mother to Wu Commandery (around present-day Suzhou, Jiangsu), he gave up his plan to leave Jiangdong and headed to Wu Commandery to meet Zhou Yu.

In 200, after Sun Ce was assassinated, his younger brother Sun Quan succeeded him as the warlord controlling the Jiangdong territories. When Lu Su arrived in Wu Commandery, Zhou Yu told him, "In the past, Ma Yuan once told Emperor Guangwu, 'In this era, not only do lords choose their subjects; subjects also choose the lords they wish to serve.' The new lord [Sun Quan] welcomes and respects persons of virtue and talent. He has recruited many extraordinary people. Besides, I also heard a saying that in the past, philosophers predicted that the successor to the Liu clan's empire [the Han dynasty] will rise in the southeast. As you can see, these events are already in motion. This is the time for heroes to rise up and showcase their talents and abilities, and contribute to the construction of a new empire to receive the Mandate of Heaven. Having said this, I don't think you need to take Liu Ye's words to heart." Lu Su heeded Zhou Yu's advice and remained in Jiangdong.

The historian Chen Shou, who wrote Lu Su's biography, believed that Zhou Yu recommended Lu Su to Sun Quan because he knew that his lord needed to widely recruit more of such talents to accomplish his goal of building up his power bloc. Therefore, he could not afford to let Lu Su leave with Liu Ye.

Drafting a plan for Sun Quan
Sun Quan immediately summoned Lu Su to meet him, and was pleased to see Lu Su. When the other guests were leaving after the meeting, Lu Su also took his leave but Sun Quan called him back. They shared a table and had a private conversation over drinks. Sun Quan asked, "The Han dynasty is in decline and there is turmoil everywhere. I have inherited the work of my father and elder brother, and I intend to make achievements like those of Duke Huan of Qi and Duke Wen of Jin. I am honoured to have your noble patronage. What advice do you have for me?" Lu Su replied:  Sun Quan replied, "Now, I am doing my best to support the Han dynasty. What you said can't be achieved."

Zhang Zhao, a senior adviser to Sun Quan, felt that Lu Su was not humble enough so he often spoke ill of Lu Su in front of their lord. Pointing out that Lu Su was too young and neglectful, Zhang Zhao advised Sun Quan to refrain from entrusting Lu Su with important responsibilities. However, Sun Quan ignored Zhang Zhao and continued to treat Lu Su respectfully and regard him highly. He gave new clothes and curtains to Lu Su's mother and restored Lu Su's family to their prior status as a wealthy family.

Formation of the Sun–Liu alliance
When Liu Biao died in 208, his younger son Liu Cong succeeded him as the Governor of Jing Province (covering present-day Hubei and Hunan). Upon receiving news of Liu Biao's death, Lu Su told Sun Quan,  Sun Quan then sent Lu Su as his representative to Jing Province.

When Lu Su reached Xiakou (夏口; present-day Hankou, Hubei), he heard that Cao Cao and his forces were advancing towards Jing Province so he travelled day and night in the hope of reaching Xiangyang (Jing Province's capital) in the shortest time possible. When he arrived at Nan Commandery (南郡; around present-day Jingzhou, Hubei), he received news that Liu Cong had already surrendered to Cao Cao, and that Jing Province was now under Cao Cao's control. At the same time, Liu Bei had been defeated at the Battle of Changban and was trying to cross the Yangtze and head further south. Lu Su met Liu Bei at Changban (長阪; in present-day Dangyang, Hubei), where he conveyed Sun Quan's intentions to Liu Bei and pointed out that Jiangdong was very stable. Liu Bei was delighted. Lu Su also met and befriended Liu Bei's adviser Zhuge Liang; he told Zhuge Liang that he was a friend of Zhuge Jin, Zhuge Liang's elder brother. Liu Bei moved to Xiakou, where he instructed Zhuge Liang to follow Lu Su to meet Sun Quan and discuss the formation of a Sun–Liu alliance against Cao Cao.

Contradiction
Pei Songzhi, who annotated Lu Su's biography, argued that Lu Su was actually the first person to propose forming a Sun–Liu alliance against Cao Cao. When Lu Su told Zhuge Liang that he was Zhuge Jin's friend, Zhuge Liang would probably have already heard of Lu Su but had yet to meet him in person. Pei Songzhi pointed out that Zhuge Liang's biography in the Shu Shu (蜀書; Book of Shu) recorded: "Zhuge Liang persuaded Sun Quan with his argument on forming an alliance. Sun Quan was very pleased." Going by the Shu Shu account, the first person who suggested the Sun–Liu alliance should be Zhuge Liang instead of Lu Su. Pei Songzhi commented that the historians in Eastern Wu and Shu Han gave conflicting accounts on who was the first person who conceived the idea of the Sun–Liu alliance because they wanted their respective states to claim that credit. Pei Songzhi also remarked that this was one of the flaws in the Sanguozhi because the author Chen Shou wrote both Lu Su and Zhuge Liang's biographies but the two biographies contradict each other on this point.

Urging Sun Quan to resist Cao Cao
In late 208, when Sun Quan received news that Cao Cao was planning to lead his forces across the Yangtze to invade Jiangdong, he discussed with his subjects on how to deal with Cao Cao. Everyone present at the meeting advised Sun Quan to surrender and welcome Cao Cao; only Lu Su remained silent. When Sun Quan left the meeting for a change of clothes, Lu Su hurriedly left his seat and followed his lord. Sun Quan sensed that Lu Su had something to say so he held Lu Su's hand and asked him, "What do you want to tell me?" Lu Su replied,  Sun Quan sighed, "I am very disappointed with those gentlemen. Your thoughts are exactly the same as mine. That's why I say you are Heaven's gift to me."

Alternative accounts
The Wei Shu (魏書; Book of Wei) and the Jiuzhou Chunqiu gave different accounts on how Lu Su urged Sun Quan to go to war with Cao Cao. They recorded that Lu Su attempted to use reverse psychology to persuade Sun Quan by saying, "Cao Cao is truly a formidable foe. He has engulfed Yuan Shao's territories and his forces are very powerful. If he uses the might of a victorious army to invade a weak and chaotic state, he'll definitely win. Why don't we dispatch our troops to assist him, while you send your family to Ye (Cao Cao's base in northern China)? If not, we'll be in danger." When a furious Sun Quan wanted to execute Lu Su, the latter said, "We are in dire straits. Since you have other plans, why don't you assist Liu Bei instead of executing me?" Sun Quan agreed with Lu Su's idea, so he ordered Zhou Yu to lead his forces to help Liu Bei.

The fourth-century historian Sun Sheng commented that both Wei Zhao's Book of Wu and the Jiang Biao Zhuan recorded that Lu Su urged Sun Quan to resist Cao Cao and build his own empire. When Liu Biao died, Lu Su advised Sun Quan to observe the developments. There was no mention of Lu Su using reverse psychology to persuade Sun Quan to go to war with Cao Cao. Sun Sheng pointed out that there were many others among Sun Quan's subjects who urged their lord to surrender, so it made no sense for Sun Quan to single out Lu Su. He concluded that the accounts on Lu Su's use of reverse psychology are absurd and unreliable.

Battle of Red Cliffs
At the time, Zhou Yu was in Poyang County so Lu Su advised Sun Quan to quickly summon Zhou Yu back to discuss their plans on how to counter Cao Cao's impending invasion. When Zhou Yu returned, he also urged Sun Quan to resist Cao Cao. This resulted in Sun Quan arriving at his final decision to go to war with Cao Cao. Sun Quan put Zhou Yu in command of his military forces and appointed Lu Su as Colonel Who Praises the Army to assist Zhou Yu in formulating the battle plan.

In the winter of 208, the allied forces of Sun Quan and Liu Bei defeated Cao Cao's forces at the decisive Battle of Red Cliffs. When Lu Su returned after the battle, Sun Quan hosted a grand reception for him and said: "Zijing, I dismounted from my horse and received you on foot. Is this enough to illuminate your glory?" Lu Su replied: "No." All the others present at the scene were startled by Lu Su's response. After taking his seat, Lu Su raised his horsewhip and said: "I hope that our lord will spread his might and virtues throughout the Four Seas, expand his territories to cover the Nine Provinces, and successfully build an empire. When he has achieved that and he comes to receive me on a carriage, I will be the first to feel honoured." Sun Quan clapped his hands and laughed.

Handing over Jing Province to Liu Bei
In 210, Liu Bei travelled to Jing (京; present-day Zhenjiang, Jiangsu) to meet Sun Quan and request for the governorship of Jing Province. Only Lu Su advised Sun Quan to "lend" Jing Province to Liu Bei so as to strengthen the Sun-Liu alliance against Cao Cao.

At the time, Lü Fan urged Sun Quan to hold Liu Bei hostage in Jiangdong and prevent him from returning to Jing Province. However, Lu Su objected: "No. My lord, you may have received the blessings of Heaven, but Cao Cao is still a foe to be reckoned with. As we have recently taken control of Jing Province, we haven't earned the trust and support of its people yet. It's better to 'lend' it to Liu Bei and let him help us pacify the area. The best strategy to adopt now is to create more enemies for Cao Cao and less enemies for ourselves." Sun Quan agreed with Lu Su.

Cao Cao was writing when he received news that Sun Quan had "lent" Jing Province to Liu Bei. He dropped his brush upon hearing that.

Succeeding Zhou Yu
In 210, when Zhou Yu became critically ill, he wrote to Sun Quan: 

The Jiang Biao Zhuan provided a longer, but generally similar, account of Zhou Yu's message to Sun Quan before his death. Zhou Yu wrote: 

After Zhou Yu's death, Lu Su was appointed as Colonel of Vehement Martial Might and succeeded Zhou Yu. He took charge of the 4,000 troops and the four counties which used to be under Zhou Yu's control. Cheng Pu succeeded Zhou Yu as the Grand Administrator of Nan Commandery (南郡; around present-day Jingzhou, Hubei). Lu Su was at Jiangling County initially, so he moved to Lukou (陸口; in present-day Jiayu County, Hubei) and garrisoned there. Lu Su governed with justice and benevolence, and the number of troops under his command increased to over 10,000. He was subsequently promoted to Lieutenant-General and appointed as the Administrator of Hanchang Commandery (漢昌郡; around present-day Pingjiang County, Hunan).

In 214, Lu Su accompanied Sun Quan on a campaign at Wan County (皖縣; present-day Qianshan County, Anhui), a garrison under Cao Cao's control. After Sun Quan's forces emerged victorious, Lu Su was reassigned as General Who Crosses the River.

Sun–Liu territorial dispute

Background
Before Zhou Yu died, he, along with Gan Ning and others, had constantly urged Sun Quan to seize Yi Province (covering present-day Sichuan and Chongqing) from its governor, Liu Zhang. However, Zhou Yu died of illness while making preparations for an invasion of Yi Province. When Sun Quan asked Liu Bei for his opinion, Liu Bei, who secretly had the intention of seizing Yi Province for himself, lied to Sun Quan: "Liu Zhang and I are members of the imperial clan, so we should strive to uphold the Han dynasty with the aid of our ancestors' blessings. Now, when I heard that Liu Zhang has offended his neighbours, I feel afraid and don't dare to probe further. I hope you can show leniency towards him. If you don't, I will retire and return to the countryside." Liu Bei revealed his true intentions later when he attacked Liu Zhang himself and eventually seized control of Yi Province. During the campaign against Liu Zhang, Liu Bei left his general Guan Yu behind to guard Jing Province in his absence. When Sun Quan heard about Liu Bei's takeover of Yi Province, he angrily remarked: "This cunning barbarian dares to trick me!"

At the same time, tensions were rising at the Sun–Liu border in Jing Province as both sides became more suspicious of each other. Lu Su tried to reduce the tensions by being friendly towards Liu Bei's side. After Liu Bei took over Yi Province, Sun Quan asked him to return three commanderies in southern Jing Province – Changsha, Lingling (零陵; around present-day Yongzhou, Hunan) and Guiyang (桂陽; around present-day Chenzhou, Hunan) – but Liu Bei refused. Sun Quan then ordered his general Lü Meng to lead his forces to seize the three commanderies by force. When Liu Bei found out, he returned to Gong'an County and sent Guan Yu to lead an army to stop Lü Meng.

Negotiations
At Yiyang, Lu Su invited Guan Yu to attend a meeting to discuss the dispute. During the negotiations, both sides stationed their soldiers more than 100 paces away from the meeting area and the officers present at the talks were each armed with only a blade weapon. Lu Su told Guan Yu:  Before Lu Su could finish what he was saying, an unnamed person interrupted him and said: "Whoever has the ability to govern the land shall have control over it. Isn't it so?" Lu Su angrily rebuked that person in a firm and stern tone. Guan Yu drew his sword, stood up and said, "This is a state-level problem. We can't hope to understand it." He left after that.

Wu Shu account
Wei Zhao's Book of Wu provided more details on the meeting. Prior to the talks, Lu Su's subordinates feared that Guan Yu would try to harm Lu Su, so they advised Lu Su against attending the meeting. However, Lu Su replied: "It's better for us to settle this issue in a peaceful manner. Liu Bei may have acted against our lord's interests, but we haven't agreed on who is right and who is wrong. Do you think Guan Yu will dare to do something as rash as killing me at this point in time?"

Lu Su then met Guan Yu, who told him: 

Lu Su replied:  Guan Yu did not respond to what Lu Su said.

Liu Bei eventually agreed to divide Jing Province between his and Sun Quan's domains along the Xiang River. Both sides withdrew their forces.

Death
Lu Su died at the age of 46 (by East Asian age reckoning) in 217. Sun Quan mourned his death and attended his funeral. Zhuge Liang also held a memorial service for Lu Su.

Descendants
Lu Su's son, Lu Shu (217 - 274), was born physically strong. Zhang Cheng once remarked that Lu Shu would become very outstanding in the future. Between 258 and 264, during the reign of Sun Xiu, Lu Shu served as General of Illustrious Martial Might and Area Commander of Wuchang, and was named as a Marquis of a Chief Village. Between 269 and 271, during the reign of Sun Xiu's successor, Sun Hao, Lu Shu was reassigned as the Area Commander of Xiakou. Lu Shu was known for being very disciplined and competent in his duties. He died in 274.

Lu Shu's son, Lu Mu, inherited his father's marquis title and military post.

Appraisal
Wei Zhao's Book of Wu described Lu Su as follows: Lu Su was a strict person who rarely indulged in material pleasures, led a frugal life, and had no interest in common hobbies. He maintained good military discipline and executed orders without fail. Even when he was in the army, he was often seen reading books. He was proficient in arguing and writing. He could think far and possessed an exemplary sense of judgment. He was the best after Zhou Yu.

Sun Quan once told Lü Meng: 

In May 229, when Sun Quan was attending a ceremony to declare himself emperor and establish the state of Eastern Wu, he told his subjects: "In the past, Lu Zijing often spoke about what is happening now. Indeed, he had good foresight."

In Romance of the Three Kingdoms

Lu Su appeared as a character in the 14th-century historical novel Romance of the Three Kingdoms, which romanticises the historical events before and during the Three Kingdoms period. In the novel, Lu Su's role is significantly downplayed as compared to his historical counterpart, such that he is mainly used as a foil between Zhuge Liang and Zhou Yu to highlight their intelligence, especially for the former. He is also used to add minor comic relief to the rivalry between Zhuge Liang and Zhou Yu, particularly in the events leading to the Battle of Red Cliffs. Besides, he is also portrayed as an honest and sententious man who is often easily cheated and taken advantage of, resulting in his maladroit handling of the territorial dispute over Jing Province between Liu Bei and Sun Quan.

In popular culture

Lu Su was first introduced as a playable character in the eighth instalment of Koei's Dynasty Warriors video game series and Warriors Orochi 4. He also appears in Koei's strategy game series Romance of the Three Kingdoms.

See also
 Lists of people of the Three Kingdoms

Notes

References
 Citations from the Sanguozhi

 Citations from the Sanguozhi zhu

 Other citations

 Chen, Shou (3rd century). Records of the Three Kingdoms (Sanguozhi).
 
 Luo, Guanzhong (14th century). Romance of the Three Kingdoms (Sanguo Yanyi).
 Pei, Songzhi (5th century). Annotations to Records of the Three Kingdoms (Sanguozhi zhu).
 

172 births
217 deaths
Han dynasty generals from Anhui
Han dynasty politicians from Anhui
Generals under Sun Quan
Officials under Sun Quan
Politicians from Chuzhou
Political office-holders in Hunan
Sun Ce and associates